Events from the year 1815 in Sweden

Incumbents
 Monarch – Charles XIII

Events

 23 October - Swedish Pomerania ceded to Prussia.
 - Inauguration of the Fruntimmersföreningens flickskola in Gothenburg, a school founded to educate women to self-supporting professionals and the third to offer serious education to women. 
 - Sophie Daguin and André Isidore Carey are recruited to the Royal Swedish Ballet.

Births
 16 January – Uno Troili, painter (died 1875)
 10 May – Anders Ljungqvist, fiddler (died 1896)
 17 June – Thekla Knös, writer  (died 1880)
 18 December – Egron Lundgren, watercolor painter (died 1875)
 - Maria Cederschiöld (deaconess), (died 1892)
 - Emilie Risberg, educator and writer (died 1890)
 - Lotten Wennberg, philanthropist  (died 1864)

Deaths

 28 May – Charlotta Cedercreutz, artist (born 1736)
 10 August - Birger Martin Hall, botanist  (born 1741)

References

 
Years of the 19th century in Sweden